Hypolestes clara is a species of damselfly in the family Hypolestidae. It is endemic to Jamaica.  Its natural habitats are subtropical or tropical moist lowland forests and rivers. It is threatened by habitat loss.

References

Fauna of Jamaica
Calopterygoidea
Insects described in 1891
Taxonomy articles created by Polbot